Forthside Barracks is a military installation in Stirling, Scotland.

History
Forthside Barracks were built as an ordnance depot in 1899. It became the depot of the Argyll and Sutherland Highlanders before they vacated the place in 1999.

In November 2016 the Ministry of Defence announced that the facility, as well as the adjacent Meadowforth Barracks, would close in 2022.

Current units
Current units stationed at the barracks include:

British Army
154 Medical Squadron, 225 (Scottish) Medical Regiment
Detachment, D Company, 51st Highland, 7th Battalion, Royal Regiment of Scotland
Stirling Detachment, Tayforth University Officers' Training Corps
51st Infantry Brigade Cadet Training Team

Community Cadet Forces
Headquarters, A (Stirling) Company, Argyll and Sutherland Highlanders Battalion, Army Cadet Force
Stirling Detachment
1019 (City of Stirling) Squadron, Air Training Corps

References

Installations of the British Army
Barracks in Scotland